Alfonso of Aragon and Eiximenis, also known as Alfonso II of Gandia the young or Alfonso V of Ribagorza (c. 1358 – 31 August 1422) Duke of Gandia, count of Denia and count of Ribagorza, was the son of Alfonso of Aragon and Foix and his wife Violante Jimenez.

He married María of Navarra, daughter of Carlos II of Navarre, on January 20, 1393 in Tudela, Navarra. He had no legitimate children but a son out of wedlock named Jaime of Aragon, whom his father inherited with the barony of Arenós and other places.

He was pretender to the throne of the Crown of Aragon during the Caspe Compromise after the death of his father claiming a better right to the throne being descendant by King Jaime II of Aragon male straight, but had very little support and finished the final vote without any vote in his favor. He fought beside Fernando of Antequera, who was elected King of Aragon, during the siege of Balaguer when Jaime II of Urgell, one of the pretenders to the throne, revolted against King Ferdinand, blocking the city portal of Lleida, and negotiating the surrender of the rebels.

Alfonso the younger prompted the construction of important monuments such as the Monastery of Sant Jeroni de Cotalba and the Ducal Palace of Gandía, which were formerly initiated by his father Alfonso of Aragon and Foix, the old.

On his death without legitimate descendants came a lawsuit by the succession of their territories, which was resolved temporarily giving Gandia to Hugo Cardona and Ribagorza. A few years later, in 1433, Hugo de Cardona Juan II of Aragon must cede the Duchy of Gandia the infant Juan of Aragon, future. In this way they returned to join the titles of Duke of Gandia and count of Ribagorza.

See also 
 Dukes of Gandía
 Monastery of Sant Jeroni de Cotalba

Bibliography 
 Iglesias Costa, Manuel (2001). Historia del condado de Ribagorza.  . Huesca: Instituto de Estudios Altoaragoneses: Diputación de Huesca. .

House of Aragon
1422 deaths
1358 births
Dukes of Spain
Counts of Spain
Dukes of Gandía
Marquesses of Villena
Ribagorza
Monastery of Sant Jeroni de Cotalba